Uri is a small island located near Malakula, in the Malampa Province of the country Vanuatu.

References 

Islands of Vanuatu
Malampa Province